The following is a list of architectural firms. It includes notable worldwide examples of architecture firms, companies, practices, partnerships, etc.

1–9

360 Architecture, United States
3LHD, Croatia
3XN, Denmark
1100 Architect, United States, Germany
5468796 Architecture, Canada

A

AART architects, Denmark
Adler & Sullivan, United States
Adrian Smith + Gordon Gill Architecture (AS+GG), United States
Aedas, United Kingdom, United States, Hong Kong 
Allen Jack+Cottier, Australia
Allison & Allison, United States
Altius Architects, Canada
Archigram, United Kingdom
archimania, United States
Architecture Brio, India
Arkitektfirmaet C. F. Møller, Denmark
Armet Davis Newlove Architects, United States
Arquitectonica, United States
Ash Sakula Architects, United Kingdom
Ashton Raggatt McDougall, Australia
Asymptote, United States
Atelier 5, Switzerland
Atelier Bow-Wow, Japan
Auer+Weber+Assoziierte, Germany
Ayers Saint Gross, United States

B

Ballinger, United States
Barnett, Haynes & Barnett, United States
Bates Smart, Australia
Baumschlager-Eberle, Austria
BBPR, Italy
Behnisch Architekten, Germany
Bennetts Associates, United Kingdom
Benoy, United Kingdom
Benson & Forsyth, United Kingdom
Bjarke Ingels Group, Denmark
Bohlin Cywinski Jackson, United States
Boller Brothers, United States
Booty Edwards & Partners, Malaysia
Bora Architects, United States
Bregman + Hamann Architects, Canada
Brooks + Scarpa, United States
Building Design Partnership, United Kingdom

C

C Concept Design, Netherlands
Carrère and Hastings, United States
Chabanne et partenaires, France
Chapman and Oxley, Canada
Jack Allen Charney, Associates, United States
Claude and Starck, United States
Claus en Kaan Architecten, Netherlands
Concertus Design and Property Consultants, England
Consolidated Consultants CC, Jordan
COOKFOX, United States
Coop Himmelb(l)au, Austria
Cooper Carry, United States
Cooper, Robertson & Partners, United States
Costas Kondylis and Partners, LLP, United States
Cram and Ferguson, United States

D

DA Architects + Planners, Canada
Dar Al-Handasah, Beirut | Cairo | London | Pune
Davis Brody Bond, United States | Brazil 
Deborah Berke & Partners Architects
Delugan Meissl Associated Architects
Denton Corker Marshall, Australia
Diamond and Schmitt Architects, Canada
Dico si Tiganas, Romania
Diener & Diener, Switzerland
Diller and Scofidio, United States
Dissing + Weitling, Denmark
Dixon Jones, United Kingdom 
Donaldson and Meier, United States
Dorte Mandrup Architects, Denmark

E

Ellerbe Becket, United States

F

F+A Architects, United States
Farrells, United Kingdom and Hong Kong
Fender Katsalidis Architects, Australia
Fiske & Meginnis, Nebraska, United States
Flad Architects, United States
FMA Architects, Nigeria, South Africa
Foster and Partners, United Kingdom
FRCH Design Worldwide, United States
Future Systems (1982-2009), United Kingdom

G

Gehl Architects, Denmark
Gensler, United States
Gerkan, Marg and Partners, Germany
Gillespie, Kidd & Coia, Scotland
Glenn Howells, United Kingdom
GRAFT, United States
Graham, Anderson, Probst & White, United States
Greene and Greene, United States
Gregory Henriquez, Canada
Gregory Phillips Architects, United Kingdom
Grimshaw, United Kingdom
Guida Moseley Brown Architects, Australia
Gwathmey Siegel, United States

H

Handel Architects, United States
Hampshire County Architects, United Kingdom
Harley Ellis Devereaux, United States
Hassell, Australia
Haworth Tompkins, United Kingdom
Hazen and Robinson, Nebraska, United States
HDR, Inc., Nebraska, United States
Heikkinen – Komonen Architects, Finland
Henning Larsen Architects, Denmark
Herzog & de Meuron, Switzerland
HKS, Inc., United States
HNTB Corporation, United States
Hodgetts + Fung, United States
Hoffmann Architects, United States
HOK, North America, Europe, Asia-Pacific, India, Middle East
Holabird & Roche/Holabird & Root, United States
Hudson Architects, United Kingdom

I

iArc, South Korea
IBI Group, Canada
Ingenhoven Architects, Germany
Integrated Design Associates (IDA), Hong Kong

J

Jaeger Kahlen Partner, Germany, Italy, China
Jestico + Whiles, United Kingdom
JLG Architects, United States
John Robertson Architects, London, United Kingdom
Johnston Marklee & Associates, United States
Johnsen Schmaling Architects, United States

K

Sunita Kohli, (K2India - Kohelika Kohli Architects and Designers Pvt Ltd), India
Karen Bausman + Associates, United States
Kemp, Bunch & Jackson (KBJ), United States
Kimmel Eshkolot Architects, Israel
Kirksey, United States
Kohn Pedersen Fox (KPF), United States
Koning Eizenberg Architecture, Inc. (KEA), United States

L

Leo A Daly, United States
Lifschutz Davidson Sandilands, Great Britain
Line and Space, United States
Link Arkitektur, Norway
LMN Architects, United States
Longfellow, Alden & Harlow, United States
Loyn & Co, Wales, United Kingdom
Lyons, Australia

M

MacGabhann Architects, Ireland
Mackenzie Wheeler Architects and Designers, United Kingdom
Marshall and Fox, United States 
Mathews & Associates Architects, South Africa
MBH Architects, United States
McKim, Mead & White, United States
Mecanoo, Netherlands
Michael Green Architecture, Canada
Miller and Pflueger (1923–37), United States
Miller / Hull, United States
Mithun, United States
Moriyama & Teshima, Canada
Morphogenesis, India
Morphosis, United States
muf architecture/art, United Kingdom
Muhlenberg Greene Architects, United States
MulvannyG2 Architecture, United States
MVRDV, Netherlands

N

NBBJ, United States
Neutelings Riedijk Architects, Netherlands
Norman and Dawbarn, UK

O

Office for Metropolitan Architecture (OMA), Netherlands
O'Donnell & Tuomey, Ireland 
 
Omrania and Associates, Saudi Arabia

P

Pascall+Watson, United Kingdom
Pearson and Darling, Canada
Pei Cobb Freed & Partners, United States
Percy Thomas Partnership (c.1912-2004), United Kingdom 
Perkins and Will, United States
Perkins Eastman, United States
Peter Chermayeff LLC, United States
Peter Tolkin Architecture, United States
PLH Architects, Denmark
PLP Architecture, United Kingdom
Populous, United States
Pugin & Pugin (c.1851-c.1928), United Kingdom

R

R.E. Chisholm Architects, United States
RAMSA, United States
Rapp & Rapp, United States
Renzo Piano, Italy France
Reynolds, Smith & Hills (RS&H), United States
Rex Architecture P.C., United States
RHWL, United Kingdom
Rogers Stirk Harbour + Partners, United Kingdom
Ricardo Bofill Taller de Arquitectura, Spain
RMJM, United Kingdom

S

SAMOO Architects & Engineers, Republic of Korea
SANAA, Japan
Sauerbruch Hutton, Germany
Schmidt hammer lassen, Denmark
Schultze and Weaver, United States
Scott Simons Architects, United States
Shepley, Rutan and Coolidge, United States
Shilpa Architects, India & United States
SHoP Architects, United States
Shore Tilbe Irwin + Partners, Canada
Skidmore, Owings and Merrill (SOM), United States
Smith Hinchman & Grylls, United States
Snøhetta, Norway
SOMA, United States
Studio Gang Architects, United States
Synthesis Design + Architecture, United States

T

Tate Snyder Kimsey Architects, United States
terrain:loenhart&mayr, Germany
Tod Williams Billie Tsien Architects
Troppo Architects, Australia
Trost & Trost, United States
Terry Farrell, United Kingdom

U

UNStudio, Netherlands
Urban Design Group, United States
Ushida Findlay Architects, Japan/UK

V

Van Der Merwe Miszewski Architects, South Africa
Vandkunsten, Denmark
Voorhees, Gmelin and Walker, United States

W

Walker and Weeks, United States
Weiss/Manfredi, United States
West 8, Netherlands
White, Sweden, Denmark, Norway, United Kingdom
Wilkinson Eyre, United Kingdom
WOHA, Singapore
Wood Marsh, Australia
Woods Bagot, Australia
Woollen, Molzan and Partners, United States
Warren and Mahoney, New Zealand
WZMH Architects, Canada

Y

York and Sawyer, United States
Yamasaki & Associates, United States

Z

Zaha Hadid Architects, United Kingdom

See also

List of British architecture firms

References

White, Norval; Willensky, Elliot (2000). AIA Guide to New York City. New York City: Three Rivers Press.  

 
Firms
Architecture firms